KWLT is a radio station airing a Classic rock format licensed to North Crossett, Arkansas, broadcasting on 102.7 MHz FM.  The station is owned by Southark Broadcasters, Inc.

References

External links
KWLT's official website

Classic rock radio stations in the United States
WLT